Edwin Eugene Long (September 4, 1934 – October 12, 2017) was an American politician and businessman.

Long was born in Garber, Oklahoma and graduated from Garber High School. He then received his bachelor's degree in agricultural education from Oklahoma State University in 1956. Long moved to Enid, Oklahoma and owned several John Deere dealerships. Long served in the Oklahoma Senate from 1988 to 1996 and was a Democrat. After his retirement, Long moved to Stillwater, Oklahoma. He died in Stillwater, Oklahoma.

Notes

1934 births
2017 deaths
People from Stillwater, Oklahoma
Oklahoma State University alumni
Businesspeople from Oklahoma
Democratic Party Oklahoma state senators
Politicians from Enid, Oklahoma
20th-century American businesspeople